was a Japanese-based video game developer founded in 1982. Although they have made games with a wide variety of genres, they are primarily known in the U.S. for their golf and puzzle video games.

The original company exists today under the name of Daikokuya Global Holding Co., Ltd but is not currently engaged in game development. A company named Deep Co., Ltd.  acquired T&E Soft 's trademark rights on April 22, 2005, to continue game development which would go on until January 2013.

History
Founded in 1982,  T&E Soft Co., Ltd was initially named after the founder's older brother Toshiro Yokoyama and his younger brother Eiji Yokoyama, but later changed the abbreviation to "Tri & Exciting" and eventually "Technology & Entertainment".

T&E Soft started activities by selling games for NEC's  PC-6001 series. Beginning in 1983, it developed games for multiple models other than the PC-6001. In December 1983, T&E Soft published its own magazine to promote its products and by January 1985  launched its newsletter that would last until July 1990. In October 1990, Xtalsoft  was merged with T&E Soft and became  T&E SOFT Osaka Development Department.

The company became famous for its 8-bit personal computer games including the Hydlide series. It entered the home video game console in March 1986 with the in-house development of the Family Computer software Hydlide Special which was released by Toshiba EMI. Since the success of the Super Famicom software Harukanaru Augusta, released in April 1991, T&E Soft gradually moved away from personal computers to focus on its titles for video game consoles. At some point, Square founder Masafumi Miyamoto was the majority shareholder of T&E Soft.

In May 2002, T&E Soft Corporation changed its name to D Wonderland Inc.

In April 2005, Deep Co., Ltd. acquired the trademark rights of the T & E Soft name. In January 2006, Digital Golf Co., Ltd. absorbed Deep Co., Ltd. and established a game development branch in Nagoya under the brand name of T&E Soft.

The following week on January 30, Games Arena Co., Ltd. (a subsidiary of Dwango Co., Ltd.) announced  that it would acquire all issued shares of T&E Soft Co., Ltd.

Chunsoft and Spike, which Games Arena had both previously acquired on individual basis, merged in April 2012 to form Spike Chunsoft. The new T&E Soft Co., Ltd was absorbed and merged with Spike Chunsoft in January 2013. (Games Arena had itself dissolved in June 2012).

In January 2015, D Wonderland (the "old" T&E Soft) changed its company name to  Daikokuya Global Holding Co., Ltd.

On March 4, 2019, D4 Enterprise  announced that it has acquired the intellectual property rights of the T&E Soft game content.

Games published

3DO
Advanced Dungeons & Dragons: Slayer (Japanese release)
Pebble Beach Golf
Devil's Course, known in US as True Golf Classics: Wicked 18
True Golf Classics: Waialae Country Club
Shadow: War Of Succession (Japanese release)

Game Boy
Chikyū Kaihō Gun ZAS

Mega Drive/Genesis
New 3D Golf Simulation: Harukanaru Augusta
Undead Line

MSX
3-D Golf Simulation
Pyramid Warp
Battle Ship Clapton II
Daiva Story 4
Daiva Story 5
Ashguine Story 2
Greatest Driver
Hydlide
Hydlide 2
Hydlide 3
Laydock
Rune Worth
Laydock 2 Last Attack
Super Laydock
Butaporc
Psy-o-blade
Undead Line

PlayStation
Cu-On-Pa
Sonata

Super NES/Super Famicom
BUSHI Seiryūden: Futari no Yūsha
Cu-On-Pa
Pebble Beach no Hatou New: Tournament Edition, known in the US as True Golf Classics: Pebble Beach Golf Links
New 3D Golf Simulation: Waialae no Kiseki, known in the US as True Golf Classics: Waialae Country Club
Devil's Course, known in the US as True Golf Classics: Wicked 18
Lode Runner Twin: Justy to Liberty no Daibouken
The Lost Vikings, (Super Famicom version)
Sword World SFC
Sword World SFC 2: Inishie no Kyojin Densetsu

Virtual Boy
Golf
Red Alarm

Games developed

3DO
Pebble Beach Golf

Game Boy
Chikyū Kaihō Gun ZAS

Genesis/Mega Drive
New 3D Golf Simulation: Waialae no Kiseki
Pebble Beach Golf Links
Undead Line
Super Hydlide A different name for this port of Hydlide 3.

MSX
Hydlide
Hydlide II: Shine of Darkness
Hydlide 3: The Space Memories
Undead Line
Rune Worth
Daiva Story 4: Asura's Bloodfeud
Daiva Story 5: The Cup of Soma
Greatest Driver
Laydock
Pyramid Warp
Super Laydock
Laydock 2
Ashguine Story II
Trick Boy
Battle Ship Clapton II

Famicom/NES
Hydlide Special on the Famicom.  Hydlide on the NES.
Hydlide 3: 闇からの訪問者
 Daiva Story 6: Imperial of Nirsartia

Nintendo 64
Waialae Country Club: True Golf Classics
Masters '98: Haruka Naru Augusta

Nintendo DS
True Swing Golf

PC
Blaze and Blade: Eternal Quest

PlayStation
Blaze and Blade: Eternal Quest
Cu-On-Pa
Sonata

PlayStation 2
Disney Golf
Swing Away Golf

Saturn
Virtual Hydlide
Waialae no Kiseki: Extra 36 Holes

Super NES/Super Famicom
Cu-On-Pa
New 3D Golf Simulation: Waialae no Kiseki, known in US as True Golf Classics: Waialae Country Club
Pebble Beach no Hatou New: Tournament Edition
Power Lode Runner
Rise of the Robots
True Golf Classics: Pebble Beach Golf Links

Virtual Boy
3D Tetris
Golf
Red Alarm

References

Defunct video game companies of Japan
Video game companies established in 1982
Video game development companies
1982 establishments in Japan